Amir Mahrous (born 23 January 1998) is an Italian football player.

Club career
He made his Serie C debut for Robur Siena on 20 December 2017 in a game against Cuneo.

On 10 August 2019, he signed a one-year contract with Vibonese.

References

External links
 

1998 births
People from Savona
Footballers from Liguria
Italian people of Egyptian descent
Italian sportspeople of African descent
Living people
Italian footballers
Association football defenders
Genoa C.F.C. players
A.C.N. Siena 1904 players
Albissola 2010 players
U.S. Vibonese Calcio players
Serie C players
Sportspeople from the Province of Savona